Zöe Elizabeth Lucker (born 11 April 1974) is an English actress. She is known for her roles as Tanya Turner in the ITV drama series, Footballers' Wives; Vanessa Gold in the long-running BBC One soap opera, EastEnders; Carol Barry in the BBC One school-based drama series, Waterloo Road; and Reenie McQueen in the Channel 4 soap opera, Hollyoaks.

Education
Lucker was educated at Huddersfield New College. She studied acting at Oscars Academy of Performing Arts in Huddersfield, and later at the Manchester Arden School of Theatre.

Career
In 2002, Lucker began portraying the role of Tanya Turner on ITV drama series, Footballers' Wives. In 2004, she was nominated and won a TV Quick and TV Choice Award for Best Actress for her role of Tanya Turner; she was also nominated for a National Television Award in the category of Most Popular Actress for her work on Footballers' Wives. In 2005, Lucker toured New Zealand extensively in the play Then Comes Love as the female lead Jane opposite Shane Cortese and played the lead role in Bombshell for ITV1, broadcast in New Zealand. She also appeared in BBC drama series, HolbyBlue, playing the role of Kate Keenan. In 2009, Lucker appeared on Who Wants to Be a Millionaire? alongside John Suchet, winning £150,000 for the Caron Keating Foundation

In September 2009, Lucker was announced as a contestant for series 7 of Strictly Come Dancing. Her former Footballers Wives co-star, Laila Rouass also participated in the series. She was partnered up with professional ballroom dancer James Jordan. Despite earning high scores and having the third highest average, the couple were eliminated on 31 October, after being in a dance-off against Ali Bastian and her partner Brian Fortuna. In November that year, it was confirmed that she would take part in the Strictly Come Dancing 2010 live tour at arenas across the UK.

In March 2010, Lucker joined the cast of BBC soap opera, EastEnders, to portray the role Vanessa Gold. She left in October 2011. In June 2012, Lucker joined the cast of Waterloo Road, to play Carol Barry, the matriarch of the crime family from Liverpool. In February 2015, Lucker joined the cast of Hollyoaks, to play Reenie McQueen. Reenie has been billed as "good-time party girl without an 'off' switch and can be exhausting company although deep down she is the most vulnerable of Nana's children" and hasn't set the best example to her children and has let them down in the past. She made her first appearance on 16 April 2015. It was later announced in December 2015 that Lucker would be leaving the role at the conclusion of the child sexual abuse storyline, with Reenie making her final appearance on 30 June 2016.

Personal life
Lucker is engaged to her partner, film editor James Herbert, with whom she had a daughter in September 2008.

Filmography

Awards
 Nominated for Most Popular Actress, 2004 – National Television Awards
 Most Popular Actress, 2004 TV Quick Awards

References

External links
 

1974 births
Living people
English soap opera actresses
English television actresses
Actresses from Huddersfield
Actresses from Yorkshire
20th-century English actresses
21st-century English actresses
People educated at Huddersfield New College